Vilhelm Peter Carl Petersen (17 December 1812 – 25 July 1880) was a Danish landscape painter. He was one of the first Danish landscape painters to work on Bornholm and in the moorlands of Jutland. Small fishing villages were especially attractive to him.

Biography
Vilhelm Petersen was born in  Copenhagen.
He was the son of a wagon manufacturer.
In 1830, he became a student at the Royal Danish Academy of Fine Arts where he studied landscape painting. His work was first featured at the Charlottenborg Spring Exhibition in 1833. His first painting, A Party in Nødebo, was purchased by the Kunstforeningen.

He received a travel stipend from the Academy in 1848 but, because of the political unrest in Europe, had to postpone leaving until 1850. Travelling to Italy by way of the Netherlands, Germany and the Tyrol, he spent two years in Rome.

He exhibited regularly until 1860, then stopped for a few years; holding some major showings from 1873 to 1874. Part of this break was due to family obligations that arose from his father's illness and death and the necessity of taking work as a drawing teacher. In 1864, he  married Sophie Margrethe Sørensen-Groth (1838-1916), the daughter of a retired sea captain. In 1877, he was a recipient of the "Sødrings Legat", an endowment for artists established by the painter Frederik Sødring.

He died in Copenhagen and was buried at  Assistens Cemetery.
His art is on display at the National Gallery of Denmark as well at Øregaard Museum, Bornholm Art Museum, Sorø Art Museum, Helsingør City Museum, Skovgaard Museum and  Randers Museum of Art.

Gallery

References

External links

 Works by Petersen in major collections:
 Study of a Stone Heap, 1843, oil on canvas; Statens Museum for Kunst, Copenhagen, Denmark. 
 The Rhine at Remagen, 1850, oil on paper, laid down on canvas; in the collection of the Metropolitan Museum of Art, New York. 
 Rhine Landscape, ca. 1850, oil on paper, laid down on canvas; in the collection of the Metropolitan Museum of Art, New York. 
 View towards Hesbjerg from the Hornbaek Estate, 1857, oil on paper on board; Fitzwilliam Museum, Cambridge, England. 

1812 births
1880 deaths
Artists from Copenhagen
19th-century Danish painters
Danish male painters
Danish cityscape artists
Danish landscape painters
Royal Danish Academy of Fine Arts alumni
Burials at Assistens Cemetery (Copenhagen)
19th-century Danish male artists